Ashraf E. Fagih (Pronounced: "Fa-geeh") is a Saudi author and academic. He is one of the few notable science fiction authors in the Arab Gulf states.

First published at the age of twenty, he is noted for his writings in science fiction, historical fantasy, and mainstream culture.

Ashraf was the scientific editor of Al-Qafilah magazine between 2014 and 2017.  He has been an invitee to numerous events on creative writing and the literature of science, including Ithra's Tanween Creativity Season and the World Science Fiction Convention (DisCon III).

Bibliography

Novels 
 A Portrait of the Void – رسم العدم. 2020. A historical novel following the life of 13th century Pisan mathematician Leonardo Fibonacci, and his introduction of the Arabic Numerals to Europe. 
 The Impaler – المُخوزِق.  2012. A  historical thriller tracing the origins of Count Vlad Dracula's struggle against the Ottomans in the 15th century. ,

Short story collections 
 Over Twenty Lives – نيّف وعشرون حياة. 2006. Arabic science fiction short stories. , 
 Longing to the Stars – حنيناً إلى النجوم. 2000. Arabic science fiction short stories. 
 The Ghosts’ Hunter – صائد الأشباح. 1997. Arabic science fiction short stories.

Co-translations 
 Wild Cards #1 - بطاقات جامحة. Arabic translation, published by Yatakhayaloon - 2021. 
 Writing Tools: 50 Essential Strategies for Every Writer - أدوات الكتابة. Arabic translation, published by Takween - 2017.

Education 
Ashraf holds an undergraduate degree (with Honors) in Computer Engineering from King Fahd University of Petroleum & Minerals, a master's degree in Computer Science from Texas A&M University, and a PhD degree from Queen's University. His doctoral work explores performance and design issues related to hybrid wireless environments, such as the Internet of Things.

Academic career 
Between 2013 and 2018, he was an assistant professor with the Department of Information & Computer Science at King Fahd University of Petroleum & Minerals (KFUPM).
He also served as the Supervisor of University Relations & Community Outreach, and as the deputy director of the Information Technology Center in KFUPM. 
Dr. Fagih taught many specialized courses according to variety of concepts, including Massive Open Online Courses (MOOC), where he offered the first-ever Arab course on a MOOC platform in October 2013.

References

External links 
 Ashraf Fagih's Goodreads author profile
 List of scientific publications

People from Medina
Saudi Arabian writers
Arab novelists
Saudi Arabian novelists
Science fiction writers
King Fahd University of Petroleum and Minerals alumni
Texas A&M University alumni
Queen's University at Kingston alumni
Living people
1977 births